Sutka City TV is a television station broadcasting from Paris, France, in the Romani language.  Andrijano Dzeladin established the station in September 2012, to end prejudice and to provide a link for the Romani people.

Dzeladin, a Macedonian citizen, named the television station after Sutka, a suburb of Skopje, the capital of Macedonia.  He said that the Roma have "a culture, an anthem, a flag and integrity".  He wants the Romani language to be spoken in all the programs broadcast from the television station.  According to the report by France 24, "most programs—culinary, cultural or musical—involve listeners."

Dzeladin performs almost all tasks himself, and broadcasts from a studio in an apartment in the 19th arrondissement of Paris.

External links
Sutka City TV (official website)
Live from a Paris apartment, the first Roma TV station - FRANCE - FRANCE 24—France 24 (September 5, 2013)
LUMIJAKERE RROMA: SUTKA CITY TV REPORTAGE ON THE FRANCE TV 3
In France, Romas find a voice through their own TV channel - The Globe and Mail—The Globe and Mail (October 14, 2013)

19th arrondissement of Paris
Romani-language mass media
Television channels and stations established in 2012
Television stations in France